A tarmida (singular form in , plural form in  ;) is a junior priest in Mandaeism. Ganzibras, or head priests, rank above tarmidas.

Ordination

Tarmida initiates or novices can come from any "pure" family. In other words, the families must be ritually pure, meaning that there are no family members who have committed grave sins. Ritually pure laymen are also known as hallali in Mandaic. Typically, the novices have been trained as ritual assistants (šganda or ašganda) when they were children. Initiates may or may not be married, although typically they are not yet married.

In order to be ordained as a tarmida, the initiate must go through a complex series of initiation rituals lasting 68 days. Various rituals are performed by the initiator priest, who recites from priestly esoteric texts such as The Coronation of the Great Shishlam, the Scroll of Exalted Kingship, The Great Supreme World, and the Qolasta. Ritual helpers (šganda or  ), who represent emissaries from the World of Light, also help perform the rituals, many of which are held in a specially constructed priest initiation hut (škinta) and also a nearby temporary reed hut (andiruna).

Stages
For the first 7 of the 68 days, both the novice and the initiator stay in the škinta without sleeping. This period is concluded by the novice baptizing the initiator.
Next, the novice goes through 60 days of seclusion, maintains his ritual purity, and cooks his own food. Only the šganda, who visits everyday to exchange kušṭa, is allowed to come in contact with the novice during these 60 days of seclusion. 180 rahmas (devotional prayers) are recited during these 60 days, with 60 prayers each meant for the soul, spirit, and body (hence 3 sets of 60) as the Coronation text explains.
After the 60 days of seclusion are over, additional rituals are performed with priests, including a zidqa brikha (blessed oblation) ritual meal.
Finally, the novice baptizes his initiator again, and the 68-day ordination ceremony is complete.

Prayer sequence

Below is the sequence of Qolasta prayer numbers for the tarmida initiation according to both the Coronation and Exalted Kingship. Exalted Kingship contains more detailed descriptions of the rituals, while the Coronation is shorter. During the prayers, pihta  (sacramental bread) and mambuha  (sacramental water) are also consumed. Ritual handclasps (kušṭa) are often exchanged between the novice and the initiator, and sometimes also with the ritual assistant (šganda). Various names of the deceased (zhara ) are also uttered along with the prayers.

Initiation begins

Preparation for baptizing novice

Baptism of novice begins

The Coronation contains 3 sets of prayers during the final part of the ritual that are not listed in Exalted Kingship.

Novice crowned

Wine ceremony

Cult hut (škinta) period begins

Prayers 34 and 119–122 are included in the Coronation, but not Exalted Kingship.

Gallery
The gallery below contains images of a tarmida initiation held in Baghdad in 2008.

References

External links

The Worlds of Mandaean Priests
Initiation of a Priest (Slideshow)

Mandaic words and phrases
Mandaean titles
Mandaean rituals
Rites of passage